An Uncertain Collision is the second studio album by Mexican progressive metal and Latin metal band Acrania, released on October 20, 2012 with the support of Mexico's Council for Culture and Arts. A music video was released for the album's first single "Treason, Politics & Death" on January 8, 2013.

Track listing

Personnel 
Acrania

 Luis Oropeza – Vocals, Guitars
 Johnny Chavez – Drums
 Félix Carreón – Guitars
 Alberto Morales – Bass
 Ignacio Gómez Ceja – Percussion

Additional musicians

 Lucas Moreno - Flute, Sax
 Oscar Pineda – Trombone
 Said Cuevas – Trumpet
 Julián Roberto Flores Millán - Trumpet
 Alan Hernández Varela - Trumpet 
 David Contreras Cortés - Sax

Production and design

 Johnny Chavez – production, engineering, mixing
 Acrania – production, music arrangement
 Jesús Bravo - Mastering
 Eliran Kantor – artwork
 Darío Baez – photography

References 

Acrania (band) albums
2012 albums